Joseph-Alfred Foulon (29 April 1823 – 23 January 1893) was a French Roman Catholic Cardinal and Archbishop of Lyon.

Life
Foulon was born in Paris and studied in the Saint-Sulpice Seminary. He was ordained priest on 18 December 1847 in Paris, where he taught for twelve years in the minor seminary.

He was elected bishop of Nancy on 27 March 1867. He took part in the First Vatican Council. He was promoted to the Metropolitan See of Besançon on 30 March 1882, and transferred to the Metropolitan See of Lyon on 26 May 1887.Pope Leo XIII created him cardinal priest in the consistory of 24 May 1889 with the title of Sant'Eusebio.

Cardinal Foulon died on 23 January 1893 in Lyon. His funeral pronouncement was made on 16 March 1893  and was buried in Lyon Cathedral.

External links
The Cardinals of the Holy Roman Church - Biographical Dictionary
Catholic Hierarchy data for this cardinal 

|

1823 births
1893 deaths
Clergy from Paris
19th-century French cardinals
Cardinals created by Pope Leo XIII
Archbishops of Besançon
Bishops of Nancy
Archbishops of Lyon
Burials at Lyon Cathedral